Tessitura normally refers to the musical concept of an acceptable range of notes for a voice or instrument as required by a given composition. 

Tessitura may also refer to:

Tessitura (software), marketing and ticket sales software
"Tessitura", a song by Animals as Leaders from their self-titled debut album, 2009